Raffaele Serio (born 22 April 1999) is an Italian rower.

He won the gold medal with Giuseppe Di Mare, lightweight coxless pair, at the 2019 World Rowing Championships.

References

External links

1999 births
Living people
Italian male rowers
World Rowing Championships medalists for Italy